Frederick Leeder (born 15 September 1936) is an English former footballer who played as a full back in the Football League for Everton, Darlington and Southport. He also played non-league football for Runcorn. The Daily Express report of his only League match for Everton, on 11 January 1958 against Chelsea, described how "Brabrook, with some mazy dribbles, made it a nightmare debut for 19-year-old Everton left back Fred Leeder."

References

1936 births
Living people
Footballers from Northumberland
English footballers
Association football defenders
Everton F.C. players
Darlington F.C. players
Southport F.C. players
Runcorn F.C. Halton players
English Football League players